The following is a list of notable alumni of Louisiana State University.

Academia

 Jonathan Alexander (PhD 1993), rhetorician and professor of English at University of California, Irvine.
 Ray Authement (MA 1952, PhD 1956), fifth president of the University of Louisiana at Lafayette, 1974 to 2008; the longest serving president of a public university in the United States; received two graduate degrees from LSU; father of Louisiana state archives
 Sally Clausen (three LSU degrees in 1967, 1971, and 1980), former Louisiana commissioner of higher education; former president of Southeastern Louisiana University
 John R. Conniff (MA 1923 English), New Orleans and Baton Rouge educator; president of Louisiana Tech University from 1926–1928
 John B. Conway (PhD 1965), professor emeritus of mathematics at George Washington University
 Edwin Adams Davis (PhD in history from LSU), former professor of History at LSU; author of two textbooks
 Colleen Denney (BA 1981, MA 1983), Professor of Art History and Gender and Women's Studies at the University of Wyoming
 Ronald G. Douglas (PhD 1962), Distinguished Professor of Mathematics at Texas A&M University
 Kathleen Fitzpatrick, former professor of English at Pomona College; Director of Digital Humanities and Professor of English at Michigan State University
 Michael I. Jordan (BS Psychology 1974), leading researcher in machine learning at University of California, Berkeley
 Joomyeong Kim (PhD 1995), Russell Thompson, Jr. Family Professor of Biology at LSU
 Jeffrey A. Lockwood (PhD entomology), award-winning author and University of Wyoming professor of Natural Sciences and Humanities
 Ray Marshall, Professor Emeritus of the Audre and Bernard Rapoport Centennial Chair in Economics and Public Affairs at the University of Texas at Austin
 Leon C. Megginson (PhD 1952), later became an LSU faculty member in the business school, notable in part for his clarifying statements about Darwinism 
 J. Tinsley Oden (BS 1959), pioneer in the field of computational mechanics; professor at The University of Texas at Austin
 Virgil Orr (BS, MS 1948, PhD 1950, chemical engineering), Louisiana Tech University vice president; former state representative from Lincoln and Union parishes
 Arthur T. Prescott (BA 1883), later M.A., first president of Louisiana Tech University (1895–1899)
 Bin Ramke, professor at University of Denver, poet, winner of the 1978 Yale Younger Poets Prize
 Charles P. Roland (PhD), historian at Tulane University and the University of Kentucky and specialist in the American Civil War and the American South
 Ralph L. Ropp (MA 1925), professor at Northwestern State University 1923–1949; president of Louisiana Tech University 1949–1962
 Martha Serpas (BA), poet, professor of creative writing in University of Houston Creative Writing Program
 Robert B. Stobaugh (PhD), retired professor of Harvard Business School and currently at Rice University
 Virgil Suárez (MFA 1987), professor of English at Florida State University, award-winning writer
 Ivory A. Toldson (BS 1995), educational scholar, counseling psychology professor at Howard University, and award-winning author.
 Olympia Vernon (MFA 2002), author, Hallie Ford Chair in Writing at Willamette University
 Richard M. Weaver (PhD English), professor of English at the University of Chicago, known for the book, Ideas Have Consequences
 Allen Wier (MA), professor at University of Tennessee
 Dara Wier, director of MFA Program for Poets & Writers at the University of Massachusetts Amherst, award-winning poet
 John D. Winters (BA, MA, PhD), historian, Louisiana Tech University

Business, economics, entrepreneurs 
 Clarence P. Cazalot, Jr., president and chief executive of Marathon Oil Corporation
 Pollyanna Chu, Hong Kong businesswoman
 Lod Cook, co-chairman of the board of Global Crossing
 Ruth Fertel, founder of Ruth's Chris Steak House
 Todd Graves, founder and CEO of Raising Cane's Chicken Fingers
 Starr Long, game producer at the companies Origin Systems (1992–2000), Destination Games (2000–2008), and Portalarium (2013–present).
 William S. Patout, III, Iberia Parish sugar grower
 L. J. Sevin, Founder of Mostek and of Sevin Rosen Funds, 1930–2015 (D)
 Patrick F. Taylor, founder and CEO of Taylor Energy Company; educational philanthropist, founder of the TOPS college tuition program

Entertainment, actors, models 
 Elizabeth Ashley, actress
 Kirk Bovill, actor, writer, songwriter
 Kenneth Brown, interior designer, host of HGTV show reDesign
 Lenora Champagne (BA 1972), playwright, theatre performer, and director.
 Christina Cuenca, Miss Louisiana USA 2006
 Greg Tarzan Davis, actor
 Jennifer Dupont, Triple Crown winner, Miss Louisiana Teen USA 1998, Miss Louisiana USA 2000, Miss Louisiana (America) 2004
 Katherine Haik, Miss Louisiana Teen USA 2015 and Miss Teen USA 2015
 Eddie Jemison, actor
 Ali Landry, actress, model, Miss USA 1996
 Amanda Joseph, Miss Louisiana (America) 2007
 Rod Masterson (Class of 1967), actor
 Elizabeth McNulty, Miss Louisiana USA 2007
 Lindsey Pelas, glamour model
 Shelley Regner, actress
 Joanne Woodward, actress
 Rachel Reynolds, model on The Price is Right

Fine arts, design 
 Malaika Favorite, visual artist and writer
 J. G. Jones, comic book artist
 Fonville Winans, photographer
 Will Wright, game designer, The Sims creator
 Robert Yarber (MFA 1973), painter, Professor of Art at Pennsylvania State University

Music 
 Mose Allison, jazz pianist, vocalist and songwriter
 Les Beasley, Southern Gospel musician
 Better Than Ezra, alternative rock band, formed at Louisiana State
 Tom Drummond, bassist for Better Than Ezra
 Kevin Griffin, lead singer of Better Than Ezra, songwriter
 Bill Conti, Academy Award and Emmy-winning composer
 Jordan Davis, American country pop artist
 Lauren Daigle, contemporary Christian music artist
 Dee-1, rapper/lyricist
 Carl Fontana, jazz trombonist
 Julie Giroux, composer
 Grits Gresham, outdoorsman, author, sportsman, co-host of ABC's The American Sportsman (1966–1979)
 John Thomas Griffith, guitarist in rock band Cowboy Mouth
 Fatma Ceren Necipoğlu, Turkish harpist
 Lisette Oropesa, operatic soprano
 Jonathan Pretus, guitarist in rock band Cowboy Mouth
 H. Owen Reed, composer
 Claibe Richardson, composer
 Chad Shelton, operatic tenor

Journalists 
 Brett Blackledge, reporter for The Associated Press in Washington D.C.; while working for The Birmingham News, won the 2007 Pulitzer Prize for investigative reporting
 Donna Britt, television news anchorwoman
 Don Lemon, news anchor and journalist, host of CNN Tonight
 Edwin Newman, NBC-TV newsman and anchor
 Rex Reed, film critic

Poets, novelists, writers 
 Julie Cantrell (B.A. 1995, M.A. 1997), novelist and editor
 A. Wilson Greene (M.A. 1977), American Civil War historian, museum director, and author
 Camille Martin, poet and collage artist
 Dinty W. Moore (MFA 1990), novelist and essayist
 Nic Pizzolatto, novelist, writer, and creator of HBO series True Detective
 Lisa Rhoades, poet
 Rebecca Wells, author of Divine Secrets of the Ya-Ya Sisterhood
 Dede Wilson, poet and writer

Government, politics, and activism

A
 Eduardo Aguirre, former United States Ambassador to Spain and Andorra
 Bret Allain (B.S. agricultural engineering, 1980), current District 21 member of the Louisiana State Senate (R)
 A. Leonard Allen, late U.S. Representative from Alexandria-based district (D)

B
 Tony Bacala, member of the Louisiana House of Representatives for Ascension Parish; law-enforcement officer
 Reggie Bagala, member of the Louisiana House of Representatives for the 54th district for four months
 Larry S. Bankston (bachelor's degree, 1973), lawyer and former state senator from Baton Rouge (D)
 Guy Bannister, FBI agent; Assistant Superintendent of the New Orleans Police Department, and private investigator; subject of Orleans Parish District Attorney Jim Garrison's JFK assassination investigation
 Edwards Barham, planter; former state senator from Morehouse Parish (R)
 Taylor Barras (Class of 1979), accountant and banker; current state representative from Iberia Parish (R)
 Carl W. Bauer (Class of 1954), lawyer; former member of both houses of the Louisiana State Legislature from St. Mary Parish (D)
 Lottie Beebe, Republican member since 2012 of the Louisiana Board of Elementary and Secondary Education from Breaux Bridge; school superintendent in St. Martin Parish since 2013, received master's degree from LSU (R)
 Clyde F. Bel, Jr., businessman and state representative for Orleans Parish, 1964–1972 and 1975–1980
 Ashley Bell, National Director of African American Engagement Office; Director of the Small Business Administration's Southeast Region
 Stuart Bishop, member of the Louisiana House of Representatives from Lafayette (R)
 Morton Blackwell, Republican National Committeeman from Virginia, formerly a political activist in Louisiana (R)
 James E. Bolin, late former state representative (1940–1944); 26th Judicial District Court judge, 1952–1960; state appeal court judge, 1960–1978 (D)
 Charles Boustany, physician, former U.S. representative from Louisiana's 7th congressional district (R)
 Mike Branch, commercial pilot from Las Vegas, Nevada, who served in the Louisiana State Senate 1996–2000 (R)
 Donna Brazile, political strategist for Al Gore's 2000 presidential campaign (D)
 John Breaux, former United States senator (D)
 Overton Brooks, late U.S. congressman from Shreveport (D)
 Edwin S. Broussard (Class of 1896), former United States senator, 1921–1933 (D)
 Chad M. Brown, member of the Louisiana House of Representatives for Iberville and Assumption parishes, effective 2016
 Henry Newton Brown, Jr., former Bossier/Webster Parish district attorney and current chief judge of Second Circuit Court of Appeal (D)
 William Denis Brown, III (1931–2012), lawyer, businessman, state senator from Monroe (D) 
 Roy Brun, former state legislator and current district judge in Shreveport (R)

C–E
 Burl Cain, departing warden of the Louisiana State Penitentiary (also known as Angola)
 Bill Callegari (Class of 1963; Agricultural Engineering), member of the Texas House of Representatives from Harris County, 2001–2015; the William A. Callegari Environmental Center at LSU is named in his honor (R)
 William Derwood Cann, Jr. (1919–2010), World War II lieutenant colonel; mayor of Monroe 1978–1979 (D)
 Thomas G. Carmody (Class of 1983), state representative from Shreveport (R)
 Edward M. Carmouche (Class of 1943, 1921–1990), chairman of the Louisiana Democratic Party 1966–1968; attorney in Lake Charles
 Davy Carter, Speaker of the Arkansas House of Representatives, completed LSU Banking School; attorney and banker
 Steve Carter, former LSU men's tennis coach and assistant athletic director; state representative from Baton Rouge (R)
 James Carville, chief political strategist for Bill Clinton's 1992 presidential campaign (D)
 Jack Christian, late businessman, mayor-president in East Baton Rouge Parish, 1957–1964 (D)
 Marcus R. Clark, justice of the Louisiana Supreme Court (R)
 Thomas G. Clausen, M.A. degree from LSU, Louisiana state education superintendent, 1984–1988 (D)
 George Henry Clinton (Class of 1889), member of both houses of the state legislature from Tensas Parish (D)
 John Cooksey, physician, former U.S. representative from Louisiana's 5th congressional district (R)
 Scott Crichton (Class of 1976), judge of the Louisiana 1st Judicial District Court in Shreveport since 1991 (R)
 Jay Dardenne, Louisiana lieutenant governor and former secretary of state and state senator (R)
 George W. D'Artois, public safety commissioner in Shreveport 1962–1976 (D)
 Jackson B. Davis, state senator for Caddo Parish and long-term attorney in Shreveport; obtained B.A. and M. A. degrees from LSU in 1936 and 1937, respectively
 Jimmie Davis, singer, Louisiana governor (1944-48, 1960-64), and Shreveport public service commissioner (D)
 Paula Davis, state representative for East Baton Rouge Parish since 2015
 Jay Dean, mayor of Longview, Texas, 2005–2015; incoming Republican member of the Texas House of Representatives, effective 2017; born in Opelousas in 1953
 Cleveland Dear, late U.S. representative, district attorney, and state district court judge (D)
 C. H. "Sammy" Downs (Class of 1933, master's in education), member of both houses of the Louisiana legislature from Rapides Parish and advisor to Governors Earl Kemp Long and John McKeithen
 R. Harmon Drew, Sr., Law school, state representative and Minden city judge (D)
 David Duke, former state representative and U.S. Senate and gubernatorial candidate (R), white supremacist and neo-Nazi
 Stephen Dwight, incoming 2016 District 35 member of the Louisiana House of Representatives (R)
 Mike Edmonson, superintendent of the Louisiana State Police since 2008 (R)
 Edwin Edwards, only four-term governor of Louisiana (D) and former U.S. Representative for Louisiana's 7th Congressional District
 John Bel Edwards, Governor of Louisiana since 2016 (D)
 Charles Wheaton Elam (Class of 1887), lawyer and state representative from DeSoto Parish (D)
 Dale M. Erdey (Class of 1976), state senator from Livingston Parish (R)

F–H
 Maxime Faget, NASA engineering and development director
 Jimmy Field (Class of 1963), member of the Louisiana Public Service Commission, 1996–2012 (R)
 Lee Fletcher, advertising executive and radio talk show host in Monroe, unsuccessful congressional candidate in 2002 (R)
 Carlos Roberto Flores, former President of Honduras
 C.B. Forgotston, late attorney, political activist, and state government watchdog (Independent)
 Murphy J. "Mike" Foster, Jr., former state senator and governor of Louisiana 1996–2004 (R)
 John B. Fournet (1895–1984), Speaker of the Louisiana House, lieutenant governor, associate and chief justice of the Louisiana Supreme Court (D)
 Bobby Freeman, former state representative and Louisiana lieutenant governor (D)
 Mike Futrell (Class of 1982), former state representative and Metro Council member (R)
 Ryan Gatti (Class of 1995), state senator for District 36 since 2016; Bossier City lawyer
 Lucille May Grace (1900–1957), register of state lands and first woman in statewide office in Louisiana; first woman to run for governor (D)
 Thomas A. "Tom" Greene, B.S., M.S., D.V.M., former state senator from Iberville Parish (R)
 Anthony Guarisco, Jr., state senator from Morgan City 1976–1988; studied for Master of Arts at LSU while in his seventies, 2008–2012; lawyer and real estate businessman (D)
 Jennifer Hale (sportscaster), Fox Sports reporter
 William T. "Bill" Hanna (Class of 1951, 1930–2016), mayor of Shreveport 1978–1982 (D)
 Mary Johnson Harris, former District 4 member of the Louisiana Board of Elementary and Secondary Education; Shreveport educator
 Kenny Havard, state representative from St. Francisville (R)
 Paul M. Hebert, civilian judge during Nuremberg War Trials
 Sharon Hewitt, member of the Louisiana State Senate from St. Tammany Parish, effective 2016
 Clay Higgins, Republican member of the United States House of Representatives for Louisiana's 3rd congressional district, beginning 2017
 Donald E. Hines (LSU-NO M.D.), Bunkie physician, former member and the president of the Louisiana State Senate 2004–2008 (D)
 J.B.E. Hittle (1951, Military and Intelligence Historian)
 Kip Holden (1974, Journalism), mayor-president of Baton Rouge (D)
 Joan Huffman, member of the Texas State Senate from Harris County since 2008; former state district court judge
 Hubert Humphrey, late 38th Vice President of the United States (D)

I–L
 Blair Imani (B.A. History), African-American Muslim activist
 Barry Ivey (B.S. finance), current member of the Louisiana House of Representatives from District 65 in East Baton Rouge Parish
 Diane A. Jenkins, former Louisiana assistant attorney general and assistant district attorney for East Baton Rouge Parish (R)
 Louis E. "Woody" Jenkins, former state representative for Baton Rouge and U.S. Senate candidate, 1978, 1980, 1996; U. S. House candidate, 2008 (R)
 Mike Johnson (Bachelor of Business Administration), member of the United States House of Representatives for Louisiana's 4th congressional district; former member of the Louisiana House of Representatives for Bossier Parish; constitutional attorney in Benton (R)
 Robert F. Kennon, late governor of Louisiana (1952–1956) (D)
 Catherine D. Kimball (Class of 1966), judge of the Louisiana 18th Judicial District Court, 1982–1992; justice of the Louisiana Supreme Court, 1993–2013
 Edith Killgore Kirkpatrick, former member of Louisiana Board of Regents; state Baptist leader (D)
 John LaBruzzo, former state representative from Jefferson Parish (R)
 Eddie J. Lambert (Class of 1978), state representative from Ascension Parish (R)
 Mary Landrieu, United States senator (D)
 Claude "Buddy" Leach, former congressman, Democratic national committeeman (D)
 Harry Lee, late Jefferson Parish sheriff (D)
 Coleman Lindsey, late state senator, lieutenant governor, state district court judge (D)
 Gillis William Long, late U.S. representative (D) from Alexandria
 Russell B. Long, late United States senator 1948–1987 (D)
 Speedy O. Long, late congressman from central Louisiana (D)

M–N
 John Maginnis, Louisiana political journalist, author, and commentator
 Sidney A. Marchand, state representative, mayor of Donaldsonville, Louisiana
 Robert M. Marionneaux, former state senator (D)
 Ray Marshall, 16th United States Secretary of Labor (D)
 Danny Martiny, state senator from Jefferson Parish (R)
 John McKeithen, late Louisiana governor, 1964–1972 (D)
 Philip H. Mecom, former US Attorney for the district of Western Louisiana 
 Tucker L. Melancon, United States District Judge for the Western District of Louisiana since 1994 (D)
 Gregory A. Miller (Class of 1985), member of the Louisiana House of Representatives from St. Charles Parish (R)
 Newt V. Mills, U.S. representative from Louisiana's 5th congressional district 1937–1943 (D)
 Ellen Bryan Moore, Register of State Lands, third woman inducted into the LSU Hall of Distinction (D)
 Henson Moore, former U.S. representative from Louisiana's 6th district (R)
 Carlos Morales Troncoso, former vice-president of the Dominican Republic
 Doug Moreau, District Attorney for East Baton Rouge Parish (1991–2009) and LSU football All-American (1964–1965) (R)
 Cecil Morgan, leader of the impeachment forces against Governor Huey Pierce Long, Jr., in 1929; later Standard Oil executive and dean of the Tulane University Law School (D)
 Jay Morris, state representative from Ouachita and Morehouse parishes (R)
 DeLesseps Morrison, Jr., late state representative from Orleans Parish (D)
 DeLesseps Story Morrison, late New Orleans mayor and ambassador to the Organization of American States (D)
 J. Kelly Nix, Baton Rouge real estate businessman; Louisiana superintendent of education 1976–1984; received master's degree from LSU (D)
 Ann McBride Norton (1944 – 2020), American activist and executive, president of Common Cause.

O–Q
 Mariano Ospina Pérez, 17th President of Colombia (1946–1950).
 Kenneth Osterberger, member of the Louisiana State Senate for East Baton Rouge Parish 1972–1992
 Abel Pacheco, former President of Costa Rica
 John Victor Parker (class of 1949), judge of the U.S. District Court for the Middle District of Louisiana 1979–2014 (D)
 Mary Evelyn Parker, former Louisiana state treasurer (D)
 Barrow Peacock, state senator from Shreveport (R)
 Leander Perez, "political boss" of Plaquemines and St. Bernard parishes (D)
 Louanner Peters, former deputy governor of Illinois
 Bryan A. Poston, late state senator for Vernon Parish (D)
 Steve Prator, bachelor's degree and attended Sheriff's Academy; sheriff of Caddo Parish since 2000 (R)
 Phil Preis (class of 1972, B.S. in accounting), Baton Rouge attorney and candidate for governor in 1995 and 1999 (D)

R–S
 Melvin Rambin, 1965 M.B.A, banker in Baton Rouge and Monroe; mayor of Monroe 2000–2001 (R)
 John Rarick, attended U.S. Army program at LSU; former Sixth District (Baton Rouge-based) congressman (D) turned (Independent)
 Jerome "Dee" Richard, Class of 1978, current member of the Louisiana House of Representatives from Lafourche Parish, one of only two Independents in the chamber
 Charles Addison Riddle III, District Attorney from Avoyelles Parish (12th Judicial District); state representative 1992–2003 (D)
 Joel Robideaux (master's in finance), state representative (R)
 Jacques Roy, mayor of Alexandria, Louisiana (D)
 Alvin Benjamin Rubin, federal judge 1965–1991 (D)
 A. T. "Apple" Sanders, Jr., member of the Louisiana House of Representatives from East Baton Rouge Parish 1956–1964
 Lucy Sanders, CEO and co-founder of the National Center for Women & Information Technology
 Steve Scalise, U.S. representative for Louisiana's 1st congressional district (R)
 Alan Seabaugh, attorney and state representative from Caddo Parish (R)
 Henry Clay Sevier, state representative from Madison Parish, 1936–1952 (D)
 J. Minos Simon, late Lafayette attorney (D)
 Eric Skrmetta (Class of 1981), member of the Louisiana Public Service Commission (R)
 Patricia Haynes Smith (graduate studies), Democratic state representative from Baton Rouge since 2008
 David Theophilus Stafford, sheriff of Rapides Parish 1888–1904 and state adjutant general 1904–1912; studied at Louisiana Seminary of Learning, a forerunner to LSU (D)
 Tom Stagg, U.S. District Court judge from Shreveport, former political activist (R)
 Richard Stalder, secretary of the Louisiana Department of Public Safety & Corrections 1992–2008; began work as a penologist while attending LSU
 Victor T. "Vic" Stelly, former state representative from Calcasieu Parish and author of the Stelly Plan (I)
 Raymond Strother (bachelor's and master's degrees in journalism), regional and national political consultant (D)

T–Z
 Lloyd George Teekell (Class of 1948), state representative from Rapides Parish 1953–1960; judge of the 9th Judicial District Court 1979–1990 (D)
 Sam H. Theriot, former member of the Louisiana House from Vermilion Parish and former Vermilion Parish clerk of court; social studies teacher, received PhD in educational administration in 2009 (D)
 Major Thibaut (Class of 1999), state representative for District 18; businessman in New Roads
 Linda Thomas-Greenfield, United States ambassador to the United Nations under President Joe Biden; previously, a diplomat in the Obama Administration
 T. Ashton Thompson, United States representative from Louisiana's 7th congressional district 1953–1965 (D)
 Ollie Tyler (Master of Education), mayor of Shreveport; former interim state superintendent of education; former Caddo Parish school superintendent
 Donald Ellsworth Walter (Class of 1961), U.S. District Judge for the United States District Court for the Western District of Louisiana, based in Shreveport, U.S. attorney for the Western District 1969–1977; native of Jennings (R)
 Rick Ward, III, state senator from District 17 since 2012 and attorney in Port Allen
 Gus Weill (Class of 1955), public relations consultant, novelist, playwright, poet (D)
 Lloyd F. Wheat (Class of 1946), attorney and state senator from Red River and Natchitoches parishes 1948–1952
 Tom Willmott, member of the Louisiana House of Representatives from Jefferson Parish since 2008 (R)
 Jerome Zeringue, incoming state representative for Lafourche and Terrebonne parishes, effective 2016

Military
 Robert H. Barrow, General, 27th Commandant of the Marine Corps
 George S. Bowman Jr., Major General, U.S. Marine Corps; Commanding general, Camp Pendleton
 Arnold W. Braswell, retired Lieutenant General, U.S. Air Force, studied at LSU between 1942 and 1944
 Charles Christopher Campbell, General, U.S. Army, commander U.S. Army Forces Command
 Claire Chennault, General, U.S. Army Air Forces, organizer and commander of the Flying Tigers
 Larry J. Dodgen, Lieutenant General, former commander, U.S. Army Space and Missile Defense Command
 Terry Gabreski, Lieutenant General, U.S. Air Force, BA History, 1973
 John A. Lejeune, General, U.S. Marine Corps, namesake of Camp Lejeune, North Carolina
 Bobby V. Page, Brigadier General, Deputy Chief of Chaplains of the United States Air Force
 Carey A. Randall, Major General, U.S. Marine Corps; Military Assistant to the Secretary of Defense 1951–1960
 Ronald G. Richard, Major General, Commanding General of Marine Corps Base Camp Lejeune
 Jeffrey W. Talley, Lieutenant General, retired, 32nd Chief of Army Reserve (CAR) and 7th Commanding General, United States Army Reserve Command (USARC) 2012–2016

Science and engineering 
 James R. Andrews, orthopedic surgeon.
 Marc W. Buie, astronomer at Lowell Observatory
 Edgar Hull (pre-medical 1923), co-founding physician of the Medical Center of Louisiana at New Orleans (1931) and the Louisiana State University Health Sciences Center Shreveport (1969)
 Mary Manhein, forensic anthropologist, founding director of FACES at LSU
 Alex McCool, former manager of the Space Shuttle Projects Office at the NASA Marshall Space Flight Center in Huntsville, Alabama
 Darrell A. Posey, anthropologist and biologist
 Wayne Winterrowd (1941–2010), horticulturist and author

Sports

Football

Baseball

Men's basketball

Women's basketball

Golf

Gymnastics

Women's soccer 
 Wasila Diwura-Soale (born 1996), Ghanaian international soccer player

Track and field
 Lolo Jones, 2008 and 2012 Olympic hurdler, track and field
 Armand Duplantis, 2020 Olympic Pole Vaulter (World record holder at 6,21m)

Wrestling

Mixed Martial Arts

Others 
 Fred C. Cole, librarian, editor, and historian

References

Louisiana State University alumni